Shamo dam (from , in  also known as Sad Shamo, is a dam in Kukherd, southwestern Kukherd District, Hormozgan Province, Iran.

Geology
The Shamo Valley basin is located in the southern part of Nakh Mountain, and southern Drakhi mountain is a beg Mount from Kukherd District, Kukherd, in (Bastak County, Hormozgan Province. It was established in 1986 in the southern Nakh mountains, in the northern area of Kukherd, located in the valley of Shamo.

References

External links
 Kookherd Website

Dams in Hormozgan Province
Reservoirs in Iran
Kukherd District
Buildings and structures in Kukherd District